Edward D. Baker (June 24, 1931 – December 11, 2013) was an American football, lacrosse, and track coach. He served two stints as the head football coach at Kalamazoo College in Kalamazoo, Michigan, from 1967 to 1983 and again from 1988 to 1989, compiling a record of 62–89–5.

Baker was born on June 24, 1931, in Cleveland. He graduated from Brooklyn High School in Brooklyn, Ohio before attending Denison University in Granville, Ohio, where he played college football. After graduating from Denison, Baker moved on to Ohio State University to pursue a master's degree and serve as a graduate assistant in the school's physical education department. He was head coach of Ohio State's varsity lacrosse team in 1954.

Baker's grandson, Matt Baker, played football as a quarterback at the University of North Carolina at Chapel Hill.

Head coaching record

Football

References

1931 births
2013 deaths
Denison Big Red football players
Kalamazoo Hornets football coaches
Ohio State Buckeyes men's lacrosse coaches
College track and field coaches in the United States
High school football coaches in Pennsylvania
Ohio State University alumni
United States Marine Corps officers
People from Brooklyn, Ohio
Sportspeople from Cleveland
Coaches of American football from Ohio
Players of American football from Cleveland